The Chipmunk Songbook is an album by Alvin and the Chipmunks with David Seville. It was released on January 1, 1962, by Capitol / Liberty

In 1986, a two-record compilation album was released by Capitol-EMI America, By Capitol Records, Inc. also titled The Chipmunk Songbook, but featuring an entirely different track listing, consisting of songs taken from various albums from the 1960s.

Track listing (1962 release)

Side one 
 "The Band Played On" (John F. Palmer, Charles B. Ward) – 2:33
 "Buffalo Gals" [featuring Mel Blanc and June Foray] (John Hodges, arr. Ross Bagdasarian, Sr.) – 3:28
 "The Alvin Twist" (Ross Bagdasarian, Sr.) – 2:40
 "Funiculì, Funiculà" (Luigi Denza, Edward Oxenford) – 2:23
 "My Wild Irish Rose" (Chauncey Olcott) – 2:43
 "Down in the Valley" (Traditional, arr. Ross Bagdasarian, Sr.) – 3:08
 "Git Along Little Dogies" (Traditional, arr. Ross Bagdasarian, Sr.) – 3:09

Side two 
 "Twinkle, Twinkle, Little Star" (Jane Taylor, Wolfgang Amadeus Mozart) – 3:34
 "On Top of Old Smoky" [featuring June Foray] (Traditional, arr. Ross Bagdasarian, Sr.) – 3:29
 "The Man on the Flying Trapeze" (George Leybourne, Gaston Lyle, Alfred Lee) – 3:05
 "Strolling Through the Park One Day" (Ed Haley) – 2:08
 "Polly Wolly Doodle" (Dan Emmett) – 3:21
 "Bicycle Built for Two" [featuring June Foray] (Harry Dacre) – 3:05
 "America the Beautiful" (Katharine Lee Bates, Samuel A. Ward) – 2:07

All songs were featured on The Alvin Show.

References

1962 albums
Alvin and the Chipmunks albums
Capitol Records albums
Liberty Records albums